Emarcea is a genus of fungi in the family Xylariaceae; according to the 2007 Outline of Ascomycota, the placement in this family is uncertain. It is a monotypic genus, containing the single species Emarcea castanopsidicola.

References

External links
Index Fungorum

Xylariales
Monotypic Ascomycota genera